Franz Lederer may refer to:

 Francis Lederer (1899–2000), film and stage actor, known in the early years of his career with the stage-name Franz Lederer
 Franz Lederer (football manager) (born 1963), Austrian football manager
 Franz Lederer (motorcyclist), a German racer in Grand Prix motorcycle racing